Euseigne is a village in the Swiss Alps, located in the canton of Valais. The village is situated in the central part of the canton, in the Val d'Hérens, south of Sion. It belongs to the municipality of Hérémence

Euseigne lies at a height of 979 metres above sea level, on the main road connecting Evolène from Sion. The village is well known for the fairy chimney rock formations named Pyramides d'Euseigne.

Situation 
Situated at the split between val d'Hérens and Val d'Hérémence, it belongs to the district of Hérens, in Hérémence commune.

The Pyramids 
The village is famous for its fairy chimney rock formations named Pyramides d'Euseigne. These are small natural reliefs, which are between 10 and 15 meters tall, are crowned by a stone and were formed by the deterioration of moraines. Thanks to their relatively big weight, these blocs protect the pyramids by compressing the underlying moraine. These pyramids were shaped after the last glaciation, and after the disappearance of the glaciers which were overwhelming Hérémence and Hérens valleys, between 10'000 and 80'000 years ago.

The main road of the valley goes through a small tunnel dug under these rock formations.

References

External links

Swisstopo topographic maps
The pyramids of Euseigne (wanderland.ch)

Villages in Valais